Liv Rundgren Tyler (born Liv Rundgren; July 1, 1977) is an American actress, producer, singer and former model. She began a modeling career at age 14. She later decided to focus on acting and made her film debut in Silent Fall (1994); she went on to achieve critical recognition with starring roles in Heavy and Empire Records (both 1995), as well as That Thing You Do! and Stealing Beauty (both 1996). She then appeared in films such as Inventing the Abbotts (1997), Armageddon (1998), Cookie's Fortune and Onegin (both 1999), Dr. T & the Women (2000), and One Night at McCool's (2001). She then played Arwen Undómiel in the Lord of the Rings film trilogy (2001–2003), which became one of the highest-grossing film series in history.

Following the success of Lord of the Rings, Tyler has appeared in a variety of roles, including the films Jersey Girl (2004), Lonesome Jim (2005), Reign Over Me (2007), The Strangers, The Incredible Hulk (both 2008), Super (2010), Space Station 76 (2014), Wildling (2018), and Ad Astra (2019). Outside of film, she starred in the HBO supernatural drama series The Leftovers (2014–2017), the BBC period drama series Gunpowder (2017), the ITV/Hulu period drama series Harlots (2018–2019) and the Fox procedural drama series 9-1-1: Lone Star (2020).

Tyler is also a singer. Having sung with composer Howard Shore, she appeared as guest vocalist on The Lemonheads' album Varshons (2009) singing a cover of the Leonard Cohen song "Hey, That's No Way to Say Goodbye". She appeared on the 2017 bonus disk of Evan Dando's album Baby I'm Bored (2003) providing featured vocals for the song "Shots Is Fired". In 2011, she released her debut single, "Need You Tonight".

Tyler has served as a UNICEF Goodwill Ambassador for the United States since 2003, and as a spokesperson for Givenchy's line of perfume and cosmetics. She is the daughter of Steven Tyler and Bebe Buell, although she has a very close relationship with her adoptive father Todd Rundgren.

Early life
Tyler was born Liv Rundgren on July 1, 1977, in New York City at Mount Sinai Hospital. She is the only daughter of Bebe Buell, a model, singer, and former Playboy Playmate (Miss November 1974), and Steven Tyler, the lead singer of Aerosmith. Her mother named her after Norwegian actress Liv Ullmann, after seeing Ullmann on the cover of the March 5, 1977, issue of TV Guide. 

Her ancestry includes Italian (from her great-grandfather), German, Ukrainian, English and African-American (from her paternal great-great-great-great-grandfather). Tyler has three half-siblings: Mia Tyler (born 1978), Chelsea Anna Tyler Foster (née Tallarico; born 1989), and Taj Monroe Tallarico (born 1991). Her maternal grandmother, Dorothea Johnson, founded the Protocol School of Washington.

From 1972 to 1979, Buell lived with rock musician Todd Rundgren. In 1976, Buell became pregnant from a brief relationship with Steven Tyler. She gave birth on July 1, 1977, naming the daughter Liv Rundgren and claiming that Todd Rundgren was the biological father because Tyler was in the middle of his well-documented drug excesses. Liv told People Magazine in 1992 that "Todd's my spiritual father. I love him". By then Rundgren and Buell had ended their romantic relationship but Rundgren nevertheless signed the birth certificate and acted as a father figure to Liv, including paying for her education.

At age 10 or 11, Liv met Steven Tyler and suspected he was her father when she observed a resemblance between her and Tyler's daughter Mia. When she asked her mother, the secret was revealed. The truth about Tyler's paternity did not become public until 1991, when she changed her surname from Rundgren to Tyler, but kept Rundgren as a middle name. Buell's stated reason for claiming that Rundgren was Liv's father was that Steven Tyler was too heavily addicted to drugs at the time of Liv's birth. Since learning the truth about her paternity, Liv and Steven have developed a close relationship. They also have worked together professionally, once when she appeared in Aerosmith's music video for "Crazy" in 1993, and again when Aerosmith performed songs in the film Armageddon (1998), in which Liv starred. Tyler maintains a close relationship with Rundgren. "I'm so grateful to him, I have so much love for him. You know, when he holds me it feels like Daddy. And he's very protective and strong."

Tyler attended the Congressional Schools of Virginia, Breakwater School, and Waynflete School in Portland, Maine, before returning to New York City with her mother at age 12. She went to York Preparatory in New York City for junior high and high school after her mother researched the school to accommodate Tyler's ADHD. She also attended the Crossroads School for Arts & Sciences in Santa Monica, California. She graduated from York in 1995 and left to continue her acting career. When asked about her youth, Tyler said: "For me, I didn't get much of a childhood in my teen years because I've been working since I was 14. But that also kept me out of trouble. When everybody was doing acid and partying like crazy, I was at work on a movie in Tuscany ... having my own fun, of course, but it was a different kind of thing. I have no regrets. I love the way my life has gone."

Career

1991–1997: Early work 
Tyler received her first modeling job at 14 with the assistance of Paulina Porizkova, who took pictures of her that ended up in Interview magazine. She later starred in television commercials. She became bored with her modeling career less than a year after it started and decided to go into acting, although she never took acting lessons. Tyler first became known to television audiences when she starred alongside Alicia Silverstone in the music video for Aerosmith's 1993 song "Crazy".

Tyler made her feature film debut in Silent Fall in 1994, where she played the elder sister of a boy with autism. In 1995, she starred in the comedy-drama Empire Records. Tyler has described Empire Records as "one of the best experiences" she has ever had. Soon after, she landed a supporting role in James Mangold's 1995 drama Heavy as Callie, a naive young waitress. The film received favorable reviews; critic Janet Maslin noted: "Ms. Tyler ... gives a charmingly ingenuous performance, betraying no self-consciousness about her lush good looks."

Tyler's breakthrough role was in the arthouse film Stealing Beauty (1996), in which she played Lucy Harmon, an innocent, romantic teenager who travels to Tuscany, Italy, intent on losing her virginity. The film received generally mixed reviews, but Tyler's performance was regarded favorably by critics. Variety wrote: "Tyler is the perfect accomplice. At times sweetly awkward, at others composed and serene, the actress appears to respond effortlessly and intuitively to the camera, creating a rich sense of what Lucy is about that often is not explicit in the dialogue." Empire noted, "Liv Tyler (here radiantly resembling a ganglier young Ava Gardner) with a rare opportunity to enamour, a break she capitalizes on with composure." The film was directed by Bernardo Bertolucci, who chose Tyler for the role after meeting with a number of young girls in Los Angeles, including Tyler's music video co-star Alicia Silverstone. Bertolucci said "there was something missing in all of them". He later said that what he saw in Tyler was a gravitas he described as "a New York aura". During promotion of the film, Tyler said she wanted to separate herself from the character during production: "I tried my damnedest not to think of my own situation. But at one point, after a take, I just started to cry and cry. I remembered when I found out about my dad and how we just stared at each other from head to toe taking in every nook and cranny."

She later appeared in That Thing You Do! (1996), a movie about a fictional one-hit wonder rock band called The Oneders, following their whirlwind rise to the top of the pop charts and, just as quickly, their plunge back to obscurity. The film was written and directed by Tom Hanks. It grossed over $25 million worldwide, and received favorable reviews. In 1997, she appeared in Inventing the Abbotts as the daughter of Will Patton and Barbara Williams' characters. The movie is based on a short story by Sue Miller. Entertainment Weekly declared Tyler's performance as "lovely and pliant". That same year, Tyler was chosen by People magazine as one of the 50 Most Beautiful People.

1998–2000: Mainstream exposure

Tyler next appeared in Armageddon (1998), where she played the daughter of Bruce Willis' character and love interest of Ben Affleck's character. The film generated mixed reviews, but it was a box office blockbuster, earning $553 million worldwide. The movie included the songs "I Don't Want to Miss a Thing" and "What Kind of Love Are You On" by Aerosmith. In a 2001 interview with The Guardian, she said that she initially turned down the role in Armageddon: "I really didn't want to do it at first and I turned it down a couple of times, but the biggest reason I changed my mind was because I was scared of it. I wanted to try it for that very reason. I mean, I'm not really in this to do amazing things in my career – I just want it to be special when I make a movie."

She was then cast in the drama Onegin (1999), a film based on the 19th century Russian novel of the same name by Alexander Pushkin, in which she portrayed Tatyana Larina and co-starred with Ralph Fiennes. Tyler was required to master an English accent, though Stephen Holden of The New York Times felt that her approximation of an English accent was "inert". The film was critically and financially unsuccessful. That same year, she appeared in the historical comedy film Plunkett & Macleane.

She later appeared in two films directed by Robert Altman, Cookie's Fortune (1999) and Dr. T & the Women (2000). In Cookie's Fortune, she was part of an ensemble cast that included Glenn Close, Julianne Moore, Chris O'Donnell, and Patricia Neal. Her performance was well received among critics; Salon.com wrote: "This is the first time in which Tyler's acting is a match for her beauty (she's always been a bit forlorn). Altman helps her find some snap, but a relaxed, silly snap, as in the cartoon sound she makes when she takes a midday swig of bourbon. The lazy geniality of the movie is summed up by the way Emma [Tyler's character] saunters off to take a swim with her cowboy hat and pint of Wild Turkey." Entertainment Weekly also wrote that Tyler was "sweetly gruff as the tomboy troublemaker". In Dr. T & the Women, a romantic comedy, she played Marilyn, a gynecological patient of Richard Gere's character and the lesbian lover of his daughter, played by Kate Hudson.

2001–2007: Lord of the Rings and international success
In 2001, Tyler played the object of infatuation for three men (Matt Dillon, John Goodman, and Paul Reiser) in the comedy One Night at McCool's. She said the role was "definitely the first part where I had to be so physically aware and have people so aware of me physically. Maybe it's not hard for anybody else, but it is a bit for me. I mean I love my body and I feel very comfortable in my skin but this was tough." Peter Travers of Rolling Stone wrote: "Tyler, a true beauty, gives the role a valiant try, but her range is too limited to play this amalgam of female perfection."

In 2001, she starred in the feature film The Lord of the Rings: The Fellowship of the Ring, directed by Peter Jackson. She played the Elf maiden Arwen Undómiel. The film is based on the first volume of J. R. R. Tolkien's The Lord of the Rings. The filmmakers approached Tyler after seeing her performance in Plunkett & Macleane. She learned to speak the  Elvish language that was created by Tolkien. Mick LaSalle of the San Francisco Chronicle said Tyler's performance was "lovely and earnest".

A year later, Tyler again starred as Arwen in The Lord of the Rings: The Two Towers, the second installment of the series. The film received favorable reviews. She spent months learning sword fighting for the concluding battle scenes in the film, but her scenes were removed after the script was changed. The film was an enormous box office success, earning over $926 million worldwide and out-grossing its predecessor, which earned over $871 million. In 2003, Tyler featured in the third and last installment of the series, The Lord of the Rings: The Return of the King.

Following the success of The Lord of the Rings, she appeared opposite her Armageddon co-star Ben Affleck in writer-director Kevin Smith's romantic comedy Jersey Girl (2004), playing a woman who meets a widowed father, played by Affleck, and re-opens his heart to love. In an interview with MTV News, Tyler confessed that she felt "scared and vulnerable" while filming Jersey Girl, adding "I was so used to those other elements of the character [Arwen]. On The Lord of the Rings, a lot of things were done in post-production, whereas this was really just about me and Ben sitting there, just shooting off dialogue."

In 2003, she became the spokesperson for Givenchy perfume and cosmetics, and in 2005 the brand named a rose after her, which was used in one of its fragrances. In 2009, she signed on for two more years as Givenchy spokesperson. On December 8, 2011, Givenchy announced a collaboration between Givenchy perfumes and Sony Music. In the video released on February 7, 2012, Tyler covered the INXS song "Need You Tonight".

In 2005, she appeared in Steve Buscemi's independent drama Lonesome Jim, where she was cast alongside Casey Affleck as a single mother and nurse who reconnects with an old fling who has returned to their small Indiana town after a failed run as a novelist in New York. The film was screened at a special presentation at the 2005 Sundance Film Festival where it was nominated for the Grand Jury Prize. Her next appearance was in a supporting role as an insightful therapist who tries to help a once-successful dentist (Adam Sandler) cope with the loss of his family in the September 11 attacks in Reign Over Me (2007).

2008–present: Box office hits and The Leftovers

In 2008, she starred in the home invasion horror film The Strangers with Scott Speedman, a film about a young couple who are terrorized one night by three masked assailants in their remote country house. Although the film garnered a mixed reception among critics, it was a major box office success, earning more than $80 million over its $9 million budget. In an interview with Entertainment Weekly, she said The Strangers was the most challenging role of her career. "It was as far as I could push myself in every way: physically, emotionally, mentally."

She appeared in The Incredible Hulk (2008), in which she played Dr. Betty Ross, the love interest of the title character, played by Edward Norton. Tyler was a fan of the television show, and was attracted to the love story in the script. She said filming the part was "very physical, which was fun", and compared her performance to "a deer caught in the headlights". The Incredible Hulk was a moderate box office success, earning over $262 million worldwide against a $150 million budget. The Washington Post, in review of the film, wrote: "Tyler gives Betty an appropriately angelic nimbus of ethereal gentleness as the one Beauty who can tame the Beast ... during their most pivotal encounters."

Tyler appeared in two films released in 2011: Super and The Ledge. In April 2011, publishing house Rodale announced that Tyler and her grandmother Dorothea Johnson, an etiquette expert, had written a book called Modern Manners. It was released October 29, 2013.

In 2014, Tyler appeared in Space Station 76, a film directed by Jack Plotnick, also starring Matt Bomer and Patrick Wilson, as well as in the independent horror-drama film Jamie Marks Is Dead, directed by Carter Smith.

In June 2014, Tyler began appearing as a regular in the HBO television series The Leftovers. The series ended after three seasons in 2017.

In 2016, Tyler took on a role opposite Bel Powley in the fantasy/horror drama film Wildling, directed by Fritz Böhm. The film also marked her debut as a producer. It was released in 2018.

In 2017, Tyler landed a role as Anne Vaux in the BBC/HBO miniseries Gunpowder, co-starring Kit Harington. She later joined the second season of the ITV/Hulu period drama series Harlots, starring in the second and third series in a regular role as Lady Isabella Fitzwilliam.

In 2019, Tyler co-starred opposite Brad Pitt in the science fiction drama film Ad Astra, which received positive reviews from critics. In 2020, she began a starring role as Michelle Blake in the Fox procedural drama series 9-1-1: Lone Star, which is a spin-off of the drama series 9-1-1. On June 1, 2020, Tyler - together with her Lord of the Rings costars Sean Astin, Sean Bean, Orlando Bloom, Billy Boyd, Ian McKellen, Dominic Monaghan, Viggo Mortensen, Miranda Otto, John Rhys-Davies, Andy Serkis, Karl Urban, and Elijah Wood, plus writer Philippa Boyens and director Peter Jackson - joined Josh Gad's YouTube series Reunited Apart which reunites the cast of popular movies through video-conferencing, and promotes donations to non-profit charities.

Personal life

Tyler dated her Inventing the Abbotts co-star Joaquin Phoenix from 1995 to 1998. During her relationship with Phoenix, she became a vegan; however, when the relationship ended, she went back to eating meat. In 1998, she began dating British musician Royston Langdon of the band Spacehog. They became engaged in February 2001, and married in Barbados on March 25, 2003. In December 2004, she gave birth to a son. On May 8, 2008, they confirmed through representatives that they would be separating.

In June 2010, Tyler stated she was "far too sensitive" for casual dates, adding "I fall in love once in a blue moon."

In 2014, Tyler met David Gardner, a British sports and entertainment manager. They became engaged in July 2015. They have two children together: a son, Sailor Gene, born in February 2015, and a daughter, Lula Rose, born in July 2016. Tyler temporarily moved to London shortly after her daughter's birth.

Tyler learned transcendental meditation in New York City. In December 2012, she participated in a charity gala for the David Lynch Foundation to provide transcendental meditation to disadvantaged sections of society. At the event, she said, "It helps me make better decisions and be a better mother, and just deal with the daily stress of the modern world that we live in. It helps with everything."

Tyler bought a townhouse on West 11th Street in Greenwich Village, New York City for $2.53 million in 2001. In 2019 she sold it for $17.45 million in favour of London, where she has resided with her family since 2018.
She also owns a house in Malibu, California.

In January 2021, Tyler said on Instagram that she had tested positive for COVID-19 on New Year's Eve, leaving her bedridden in isolation for 10 days. She said the virus "comes on fast, like a locomotive", and "F’s with your body and mind equally".

Activism
Tyler is an active supporter of the charitable United Nations Children's Fund (UNICEF). She was appointed as a Goodwill Ambassador for the United States in 2003. In November 2004, she hosted the lighting of the UNICEF Snowflake in New York City. She was also a spokesperson for the 2004 Givenchy Mother's Day promotion in support of UNICEF's Maternal and Neonatal Tetanus campaign.

Since 2004, she has donated to the Women's Cancer Research Fund to support innovative research, education, and outreach directed at the development of more effective approaches to the early diagnosis, treatment, and prevention of all women's cancers. In October 2007, Tyler, with her mother Bebe Buell and her grandmother Dorothea Johnson, helped launch the Emergen-C Pink energy drink, in an event in honor of Breast Cancer Awareness month.

Filmography

Accolades

References

Further reading

Corliss, Richard. "One life to Liv – But can she act?." Time. June 17, 1996. Retrieved January 8, 2009.
Fischer, Paul. "The Liv Factor." Girl.com. 2001. Retrieved January 8, 2009.
Mottram, James. "BBC Movies – Liv Tyler interview." BBC Films. December 5, 2001. Retrieved January 6, 2009.
Mzimba, Lizo. " Liv Tyler on Two Towers: full interview." BBC News. December 10, 2002. Retrieved January 7, 2009.
Head, Steve. "An Interview with Liv Tyler". IGN Movies. December 16, 2002. Retrieved January 12, 2009.
Otto, Jeff. "An Interview with Orlando Bloom and Liv Tyler." IGN Movies. December 17, 2003. Retrieved January 8, 2009.
Fischer, Paul. "Exclusive Liv Tyler Interview." Girl.com. 2003. Retrieved January 8, 2009.
Cole, Bethan."Cover story: Liv a little." The Times. February 29, 2004. Retrieved January 13, 2009.
Head, Steve. " An Interview with Liv Tyler – Bringing it on home for Jersey Girl." IGN Movies. April 2, 2004. Retrieved January 19, 2009.
Collura, Scott. "Liv Tyler Talks The Hobbit." IGN Movies. May 20, 2008. Retrieved January 13, 2009.
Barnard, Linda. "It's a scream." Toronto Star. May 31, 2008. Retrieved January 9, 2009.
Palmer, Alun. " Interview: Liv Tyler on her son, work and marriage break up." Daily Mirror. June 12, 2008. Retrieved January 7, 2009.
Thompson, B. "Interview: Liv Tyler." Montreal Gazette. June 12, 2008. Retrieved January 7, 2009.

External links

1977 births
Living people
20th-century American actresses
21st-century American actresses
American expatriates in England
Actresses from Portland, Maine
Actresses from New York City
American child actresses
American child models
Female models from New York (state)
American female models
American film actresses
American people of English descent
American people of German descent
American people of Italian descent
American people of Ukrainian descent
American people of African descent
People of Calabrian descent
Outstanding Performance by a Cast in a Motion Picture Screen Actors Guild Award winners
People from Greenwich Village
UNICEF Goodwill Ambassadors
Crossroads School alumni
Models from New York City
Todd Rundgren
Waynflete School alumni